Lindsay Utz is an American documentary film editor. She is best known for her work on Bully, American Factory and Miss Americana.

Life and career
Lindsay was born in Park Ridge, Illinois and her parents are John H. Utz and Jo A. Utz. She graduated from the University of Arizona in 2003 with a B.A. in Media Studies. In 2012, she married Brannon Dobbs Ingram. 

She is a member of American Cinema Editors and the Academy of Motion Picture Arts and Sciences. More recently, she jumped into directing, signing a deal with The Machine.

Filmography

Awards and nominations

References

External links
 

Living people
American Cinema Editors
American film editors
American documentary film directors
Year of birth missing (living people)